Eremocharis may refer to:
 Eremocharis (grasshopper), a genus of grasshoppers in the family Pamphagidae
 Eremocharis (plant), a genus of plants in the family Apiaceae